Reunion is an album by B. J. Thomas, released via ABC Records in 1975. His first country album, it reached No. 59 on the U.S. Billboard Top LPs chart and peaked at No. 2 on the Top Country Albums chart. In Canada, it reached No. 40 on its overall albums chart.

Reunion contains a signature hit single by Thomas, "(Hey Won't You Play) Another Somebody Done Somebody Wrong Song". It reached No. 1 on the Billboard Hot 100, Easy Listening, and Hot Country Singles charts in the United States. In Canada, it peaked at No. 2 on Canada's adult contemporary chart, No. 2 on its country chart and No. 3 on its pop chart. It also hit No. 3 in New Zealand.

The album won Best Country Song for "(Hey Won't You Play) Another Somebody Done Somebody Wrong Song" in 1976. It was ranked the No. 17 top song of 1975.

Track listing
"(Hey Won't You Play) Another Somebody Done Somebody Wrong Song" (Chips Moman, Larry Butler) - 3:23
"Real Life Blues" (Larry Keith, Steve Pippin) - 2:47
"Crying" (Joe Melson, Roy Orbison) - 2:36
"I Finally Got It Right This Time" (Larry Keith, Steve Pippin) - 2:16
"Doctor God" (Dan Penn, Jerry McGill, Johnny Christopher) - 3:07
"Beautiful Things for You" (Barry Mason, Toni Wine) - 2:54
"Sea of Love" (George Khoury, John Phillip Baptiste) - 2:49
"Maybe It's Time to Go" (Stu Nunnery) - 3:59
"City Boys" (Bill Dean) - 2:23
"Who Broke Your Heart and Made You Write That Song?" (Michael Chain) - 3:23

Personnel
String arrangement – Mike Leech
Art direction and design – Peter Corriston
Engineer – Bob Goodman, Harold Lee
Photography by Benno Friedman
Producer, engineer – Chips Moman
Musicians: Bobby Emmons, Bobby Wood, Chips Moman, Gene Chrisman, Johnny Christopher, Mike Leech, Reggie Young, Shane Keister, Steve Gibson

Chart performance

References

1975 albums
B. J. Thomas albums
ABC Records albums
Albums produced by Chips Moman